Xinjian is one of 6 urban districts of the prefecture-level city of Nanchang, the capital of Jiangxi Province, China, located on the western (left) bank of the Gan River. It consists of two disjoint sections to the north and south of Wanli and Qingshanhu districts.

Administrative divisions
Xinjian District is divided to 12 towns and 7 townships.
12 towns

7 townships

Climate

References

External links 
 Homepage

Xinjian